Harvard University celebrated the 300th anniversary of its founding in 1936 with elaborate festivities, hosting tens of thousands of alumni, dignitaries (including United States President Franklin Delano Roosevelt, a Harvard graduate), and representatives of institutions of learning and scholarship from around the world.

Preparations 
On 15 December 1934, Harvard Trustee and director for the tercentennial celebrations, Jerome Davis Greene ( 1897), made public the preliminary plans, commencing with the "opening of a special session of the Summer schools in July, 1936 and to reach its climax in ceremonies Sept. 16, 17 and 18".

In 1935, as was the planned introduction for the celebrations, Harvard held what was up until then the largest of its Summer Schools, consisting of "thirty visiting professors from twenty-eight institutions and eighty-two members of the regular Harvard faculty." The following October Learned Hand ( 1893,  1896) was elected the president of the Harvard Alumni Association, while former-Harvard president A. Lawrence Lowell ( 1877,  1880) and Charles Francis Adams III ( 1888,  1892) were selected chairman and Chief marshall of the tercentenary meeting, respectively. On 12 November then-president Franklin D. Roosevelt ( 1903) accepted Greene's invitation to attend the 18 September celebrations. On 17 December, the Class of 1908 announced that 770 feet of iron fence would be built to replace wooden fencing in Harvard yard, as well as build "a large memorial gate in honor of the late President Eliot...in time for the university's tercentenary celebration". On 25 December, then-Harvard president James B. Conant ( 1913, PhD 1916) announced that Thomas W. Lamont ( 1892) had donated $500,000 to endow the first of the University Professorships, as part of Conant's Three-hundredth Anniversary Fund plan, which "had no intensive campaign and [did not seek any] definite sum"; however, all the money raised would be destined "for professorships and scholarships and none of it for buildings". Conant had sent a letter to 65,000 alumni detailing the purpose of the fund as well as the cost of establishing a scholarship ($25,000) and a professorship ($500,000). The first of the former was endowed by Henry Osborn Taylor ( 1878) and his wife. Harvard's endowment at the time was reported to total $26 million, well below Yale's $45 million.

On 13 January 1936, The Boston Herald reported that Stephen Leacock "[was] being considered for appointment as the first of the inter-departmental professors". That same month, Conant, in his annual report to the Board of Overseers stated:

For the celebration, the Harvard Stamp Club proposed "[a] special postage stamp to commemorate the 300th anniversary...to the Federal postal authorities". The president and secretary of the club wrote to Conant, explaining that the proposal "[did] not in any way imply that [they had] the official support of the university". Then-Massachusetts Senator Marcus A. Coolidge introduced legislation to produce a 3 cent stamp, and was not expected to be declined by the Postmaster General. However, it first had to be approved by the United States Senate Committee on Post Office and Post Roads, where opposition was not expected either. Nevertheless, the stamp did not come to be since Franklin D. Roosevelt, a noted philatelist, "blocked a move to issue a Harvard stamp out of fear he might be accused of favoring his alma mater". A Harvard stamp was eventually minted in 1986, as part of the Great Americans series and in commemoration of Harvard's 350th anniversary, portraying the bust of the statue of John Harvard on a 56 cent stamp.

Responding to the prospect of being nominated to receive an honorary degree as part of the celebration, George Bernard Shaw wrote:
 A handwritten postscript read: "I appreciate the friendliness of your attitude."

See also 

 Columbia University Bicentennial

References

Sources

"Harvard's way of soaking the rich" Harvard Alumni Bulletin; v70n17 jul 1968  p64
David McCord Notes on the Harvard Tercentenary

1935 in Massachusetts
1935 festivals
Ceremonies in the United States
Events in Massachusetts
Festivals disestablished in the 20th century
Franklin D. Roosevelt
Harvard University
Tourist attractions in Cambridge, Massachusetts
Tricentennial anniversaries